Thauan Lara dos Santos (born 22 January 2004), known as Thauan Lara, is a Brazilian footballer who currently plays as a left-back for Internacional.

Club career
Born in Porto Alegre, Thauan Lara started his career with Internacional, joining at the age of nine. Growing up, he idolised fellow Brazilian full-back, Marcelo. He made his debut in a 1–0 Série A loss to Cuiabá.

Career statistics

Club

Notes

References

2004 births
Living people
Footballers from Porto Alegre
Brazilian footballers
Association football defenders
Campeonato Brasileiro Série A players
Sport Club Internacional players